The 2017–18 Colorado Buffaloes women's basketball team represents the University of Colorado Boulder during the 2017–18 NCAA Division I women's basketball season. The Buffaloes, led by second year head coach JR Payne, play their home games at the Coors Events Center and were a member of the Pac-12 Conference. They finished the season 15–16, 5–13 in Pac-12 play to finish in ninth place. They defeated Utah in the first round of the Pac-12 women's tournament before losing to Oregon in the quarterfinals.

Previous season
They finished the season 17–16, 5–13 in Pac-12 play to finish in a 4 way tie for ninth place. They lost in the first round of the Pac-12 women's tournament to Washington State. They were invited to the Women's National Invitation Tournament where defeat UNLV and South Dakota State in the first and second rounds before losing to Iowa in the third round.

Roster

Schedule

|-
!colspan=9 style=| Exhibition

|-
!colspan=9 style=| Non-conference regular season

|-
!colspan=9 style=| Pac-12 regular season

|-
!colspan=9 style=| Pac-12 Women's Tournament

Rankings
2017–18 NCAA Division I women's basketball rankings

References

Colorado Buffaloes women's basketball seasons
Colorado
Colorado Buffaloes
Colorado Buffaloes